In the Ecstasy of Billions is a 1922 German silent film directed by Josef Berger and starring Dary Holm.

Cast
In alphabetical order

References

Bibliography

External links

1922 films
Films of the Weimar Republic
Films directed by Josef Berger
German silent feature films
German black-and-white films